Mack Francis Mattingly (born January 7, 1931) is an American diplomat and politician who served one term as a United States senator from Georgia, the first Republican to have served in the U.S. Senate from that state since Reconstruction.

Early life
Mattingly was born in Anderson, Indiana, on January 7, 1931. He served four years in the United States Air Force and was stationed at Hunter Army Airfield in Savannah, Georgia, in the early 1950s. In 1957, he earned a Bachelor of Science degree in marketing from Indiana University. Afterward, he worked for twenty years for IBM Corporation in Georgia and later operated his own business, M's Inc., which sold office supplies and equipment in Brunswick, Georgia.

Early political career
Mattingly first became active in politics in 1964 when he served as chairman of U.S. Senator Barry Goldwater's campaign for President in Georgia's 8th congressional district.  Goldwater carried Georgia.  Two years later, Mattingly would help Bo Callaway organize the Georgia Republican Party and joined his ticket as a candidate for the U.S. House of Representatives against Congressman W. S. Stuckey, Jr.  Mattingly lost the race but was elected a member of the Georgia Republican Party State Executive Committee and served as Vice Chairman from 1968 until 1975. He served as Chairman of the Georgia Republican Party from 1975 to 1977 when he began exploring a race for the U.S. Senate.

U.S. Senate tenure
In 1980, Mattingly scored a historic upset, defeating longtime Democratic Senator Herman Talmadge, outpolling Ronald Reagan who lost the state in the Presidential election to favorite son Jimmy Carter. Mattingly served in the Senate from January 1981 until January 1987, with membership on the United States Senate Committee on Appropriations, chairing first the United States Senate Appropriations Subcommittee on Legislative Branch and later the United States Senate Appropriations Subcommittee on Military Construction and Veterans Affairs.  Mattingly also served at various times on the Senate Banking Committee, the Governmental Affairs Committee, the Joint Economic Committee and the Ethics Committee. He is perhaps best remembered as a proponent of the line-item veto, a position that earned him recognition by President Ronald Reagan during his 1985 State of the Union Address.

Mattingly also garnered attention in 1981 when he submitted a budget proposal that would remove several sections of Playboy Magazine if the magazine wished to continue receiving federal funding for its Braille edition. While the motion would fail, a 1986 amendment from Representative Chalmers Wylie would successfully defund Playboy's Braille edition.

1986 campaign
In November 1986, Mattingly was narrowly defeated in his bid for re-election by former Congressman Wyche Fowler of Atlanta.

Post senatorial career
In 1987, Reagan appointed Mattingly assistant secretary-general for defense support for NATO in Brussels, Belgium. In 1988, Mattingly received the Secretary of Defense Medal for Outstanding Public Service. In 1992, President George H. W. Bush appointed Mattingly ambassador to Seychelles. He served in this position until 1993.

Mattingly remains active on several corporate and nonprofit boards.  Mattingly ran against Democrat Zell Miller in the 2000 special election to replace the deceased Senator Paul Coverdell, but Miller succeeded in holding the seat to which he had been appointed by Governor Roy Barnes.

Mattingly endorsed Fred Thompson for President in the 2008 Republican primary, and John McCain in the general. He would support Newt Gingrich for President in the 2012 Republican primary, and Mitt Romney in the general. He initially supported Jeb Bush but later Donald Trump for President in the 2016 Republican primary after Bush dropped out, and he supported Trump again in 2020.

Personal life
Mattingly married Carolyn Longcamp in 1957, and fathered two daughters, Jane and Anne. Carolyn Mattingly died in 1997. In 1998, he married Leslie Davisson, a lawyer, mediator and former judge. He currently lives on St. Simons Island, Georgia. He continues to be active in Republican politics, and he serves on a number of corporate boards.

References

1931 births
Living people
Politicians from Anderson, Indiana
Republican Party United States senators from Georgia (U.S. state)
Georgia (U.S. state) Republicans
Ambassadors of the United States to Seychelles
IBM employees
People from Brunswick, Georgia
People from St. Simons, Georgia
Military personnel from Indiana
United States Air Force airmen
New Right (United States)
20th-century American diplomats
20th-century American politicians
Members of Congress who became lobbyists